Willis Alan Ramsey is the sole studio release by the Texas songwriter Willis Alan Ramsey. The album's genre is hard to categorize with touches of country, country rock, folk, and folk rock. The tunes range from the reflection and regret of "The Ballad of Spider John" to a heartfelt tribute to Woody Guthrie on "Boy from Oklahoma". It was recorded on Leon Russell's Shelter label in 1972, and Russell sat in on piano, keyboards, and vibraphone. Other guest musicians include: Carl Radle, Jim Keltner, Red Rhodes, Leland Sklar, and Russ Kunkel. The song "Muskrat Candlelight" was covered by the band America in 1973 and by Captain & Tennille in 1976, both using the title "Muskrat Love." "The Ballad of Spider John" was covered by Jimmy Buffett on his 1974 album Living & Dying in 3/4 Time. The song "Satin Sheets" (not the Jeanne Pruett song of the same name) was covered by The Bellamy Brothers and Shawn Colvin. The album was mixed by Al Schmitt.

Track listing

Personnel
Willis Alan Ramsey - guitar, bass, harmonica, vocals
Leon Russell - piano, keyboards, vibraphone, vocals
Robert Aberg - guitar (acoustic, electric, & slide)
Red Rhodes - pedal steel guitar
Dusty Rhodes - fiddle, violin
Carl Radle - bass
Jim Keltner - drums
Russ Kunkel - drums
Eddie Hinton - guitar
Nick DeCaro - accordion, string arrangements
Charles Perrino - guitar, vocals
Ernie Watts - saxophone
Kenneth Buttrey - drums
Waller Collie - drums, vocals
Tim Drummond - bass
John Harris - piano
Cathy Pruitt - cello
Tim Self - fiddle, violin
Larry Stedman - piano
Leland Sklar - bass
Kenny Bulbey - drums
Mike Sexton - vocals
David Ward II - bells, cowbell, sound effects
Grant Conch - sound effects
Terry Dodson - sound effects
Technical
Richard Rosebrough - audio engineer
Terry Manning - audio engineer
Al Schmitt - mix engineer
Denny Cordell - producer
Bob Potter, Peter Nichols - recording engineer
Marlene Bergman - art direction
William Matthews - photography, artwork
Ellis Widner - liner notes

"Extra help from Ron Burnham, Austin, Texas. Special thanks to Leon Russell, J.J. Cale and Elliot Mazer. Also to Gregory Allman for his encouragement",

References

Willis Alan Ramsey albums
1972 debut albums
Albums produced by Denny Cordell
Shelter Records albums